Great-circle navigation or orthodromic navigation (related to orthodromic course) is the practice of navigating a vessel (a ship or aircraft) along a great circle. Such routes yield the shortest distance  between two points on the globe.

Course

The great circle path may be found using spherical trigonometry; this is the spherical version of the inverse geodetic problem.
If a navigator begins at P1 = (φ1,λ1) and plans to travel the great circle to a point at point P2 = (φ2,λ2) (see Fig. 1, φ is the latitude, positive northward, and λ is the longitude, positive eastward), the initial and final courses α1 and α2 are given by formulas for solving a spherical triangle

where λ12 = λ2 − λ1
and the quadrants of α1,α2 are determined by the signs of the numerator and denominator in the tangent formulas (e.g., using the atan2 function).
The central angle between the two points, σ12, is given by

(The numerator of this formula contains the quantities that were used to determine
tanα1.)
The distance along the great circle will then be s12 = Rσ12, where R is the assumed radius
of the earth and σ12 is expressed in radians.
Using the mean earth radius, R = R1 ≈   yields results for
the distance s12 which are within 1% of the geodesic length for the WGS84 ellipsoid; see Geodesics on an ellipsoid for details.

Finding way-points

To find the way-points, that is the positions of selected points on the great circle between
P1 and P2, we first extrapolate the great circle back to its node A, the point
at which the great circle crosses the
equator in the northward direction: let the longitude of this point be λ0 — see Fig 1.  The azimuth at this point, α0, is given by

Let the angular distances along the great circle from A  to P1 and P2 be σ01 and σ02 respectively. Then using Napier's rules we have
(If φ1 = 0 and α1 = π, use σ01 = 0).

This gives σ01, whence σ02 = σ01 + σ12.

The longitude at the node is found from

Finally, calculate the position and azimuth at an arbitrary point, P (see Fig. 2), by  the spherical version of the direct geodesic problem. Napier's rules give

The atan2 function should be used to determine
σ01,
λ, and α.
For example, to find the
midpoint of the path, substitute σ = (σ01 + σ02); alternatively
to find the point a distance d from the starting point, take σ = σ01 + d/R.
Likewise, the vertex, the point on the great
circle with greatest latitude, is found by substituting σ = +π.
It may be convenient to parameterize the route in terms of the longitude using

Latitudes at regular intervals of longitude can be found and the resulting positions transferred to the Mercator chart
allowing the great circle to be approximated by a series of rhumb lines.  The path determined in this way
gives the great ellipse joining the end points, provided the coordinates 
are interpreted as geographic coordinates on the ellipsoid.

These formulas apply to a spherical model of the earth.  They are also used in solving for the great circle
on the auxiliary sphere which is a device for finding the shortest path, or geodesic, on
an ellipsoid of revolution; see
the article on geodesics on an ellipsoid.

Example
Compute the great circle route from Valparaíso,
φ1 = −33°,
λ1 = −71.6°, to
Shanghai,
φ2 = 31.4°,
λ2 = 121.8°.

The formulas for course and distance give
λ12 = −166.6°,
α1 = −94.41°,
α2 = −78.42°, and
σ12 = 168.56°.  Taking the earth radius to be
R = 6371 km, the distance is
s12 = 18743 km.

To compute points along the route, first find
α0 = −56.74°,
σ01 = −96.76°,
σ02 = 71.8°,
λ01 = 98.07°, and
λ0 = −169.67°.
Then to compute the midpoint of the route (for example), take
σ = (σ01 + σ02) = −12.48°, and solve
for
φ = −6.81°,
λ = −159.18°, and
α = −57.36°.

If the geodesic is computed accurately on the WGS84 ellipsoid, the results
are α1 = −94.82°, α2 = −78.29°, and
s12 = 18752 km.  The midpoint of the geodesic is
φ = −7.07°, λ = −159.31°,
α = −57.45°.

Gnomonic chart
A straight line drawn on a gnomonic chart would be a great circle track. When this is transferred to a Mercator chart, it becomes a curve. The positions are transferred at a convenient interval of longitude and this is plotted on the Mercator chart.

See also
 Compass rose
 Great circle
 Great-circle distance
 Great ellipse
 Geodesics on an ellipsoid
 Geographical distance
 Isoazimuthal
 Loxodromic navigation
 Map
 Portolan map
 Marine sandglass
 Rhumb line
 Spherical trigonometry
 Windrose network

Notes

References

External links
 Great Circle – from MathWorld Great Circle description, figures, and equations.  Mathworld, Wolfram Research, Inc. c1999
 Great Circle Mapper  Interactive tool for plotting great circle routes.
 Great Circle Calculator deriving (initial) course and distance between two points.
 Great Circle Distance Graphical tool for drawing great circles over maps.  Also shows distance and azimuth in a table.
  Google assistance program for orthodromic navigation

Navigation
Circles
Spherical curves